Mecideini is a tribe of stink bugs in the family Pentatomidae. There is at least one genus, Mecidea, in Mecideini.

References

Further reading

External links

 

 
Pentatominae
Hemiptera tribes